SMA - Segnalamento Marittimo e Aereo was an Italian radar manufacturer for naval, aerial and terrestrial use, in operation between 1943 and 1994.

History
SMA was founded on August 2, 1943 in Florence by Giuseppe Salvini, Lorenzo Fernandes, Enrico Bocci. In 1948, the development of radar equipment was influenced by Nello Carrara. In 1988, the EFIM public group purchased a majority interest in the company's capital, controlling 98.8% of the shares. Following the collapse of EFIM, in 1988, ""SMA"" was merged with Officine Galileo, part of Finmeccanica.

Defence companies of Italy
Manufacturing companies based in Florence
Radar equipment of the Cold War
Technology companies established in 1943
Italian companies established in 1943